The Basilica of Santa Maria is the oldest active church in Alicante, Spain. It was built in Valencian Gothic style between the 14th and 16th centuries over the remains of a mosque.

The basilica is composed from a single nave with six side chapels located between the buttresses. In 2007, by request of the city of Alicante to the Holy See, the church was promoted to the rank of basilica.

External links

 Santa María Church. Alicante by Federico Iborra Bernad and Arturo Zaragozá Catalán. GOTHICmed: A Virtual Museum of Mediterranean Gothic Architecture.
 Iglesia de Santa María Ayuntamiento de Alicante 

Buildings and structures in Alicante
Santa Maria, Alicante
Roman Catholic churches in the Valencian Community
Bien de Interés Cultural landmarks in the Province of Alicante
Minor basilicas in Spain